The Pennsylvania class consisted of two super-dreadnought battleships built for the United States Navy just before the First World War. They constituted the United States' second battleship design to adhere to the "all or nothing" armor scheme, and were the newest American capital ships when the United States entered the First World War.

The s represented a marked increase in the United States' dreadnought technology, and the Pennsylvania class was intended to continue this with slight increases in the ships' capabilities, including two additional /45 caliber guns and improved underwater protection. The class was the second standard type battleship class to join the US Navy, along with the preceding Nevada and the succeeding ,  and  classes.

In service, the Pennsylvania class saw limited use in the First World War, as a shortage of oil fuel in the United Kingdom meant that only the coal-burning ships of Battleship Division Nine were sent. Both were sent across the Atlantic to France after the war for the Paris Peace Conference of 1919, and were then transferred to the Pacific Fleet before being significantly modernized from 1929 to 1931. For the remainder of the inter-war period, the ships were used in exercises and fleet problems. Both Pennsylvania and Arizona were present during the Japanese attack on Pearl Harbor, which brought the United States into the Second World War. Arizona was sunk by a massive magazine explosion and was turned into a memorial after the war, while Pennsylvania, in dry dock at the time, received only minor damage. After a refit from October 1942 to February 1943, Pennsylvania went on to serve as a shore bombardment ship for most of the remainder of the war. Pennsylvania was present at the Battle of Surigao Strait, the last battle ever between battleships, but did not engage. Pennsylvania was severely damaged by a torpedo on 12 August 1945, two days before the cessation of hostilities. With minimal repairs, it was used in Operation Crossroads, part of the nuclear testing at Bikini Atoll, before being expended as a target ship in 1948.

Background

The preceding Nevada-class battleships represented a leap forward from previous American battleship technology and from most contemporary foreign designs. They were the first in the world to employ the "all or nothing" armor scheme that characterized every succeeding American battleship. Devised with the knowledge that engagement ranges between battle fleets was growing greater as main battery sizes increased, the system moved away from previous designs that used heavy, medium, and light armor, in favor of using only heavy armor to protect vital areas on the ship. The new system envisioned that, at long ranges, ships would be attacked with only armor-piercing (AP) projectiles, stoppable only by heavy armor. Medium or light armor would only serve to detonate the shells. By removing gun turrets and reducing the overall protected length of the ship, the navy's designers were able to devote the weight savings to the belt, as well as extra deck armor to protect against plunging shells.

In issuing desired specifications for the design that would become the Nevada class, the Navy's General Board asked for triple gun turrets, i.e., three guns mounted per turret. They were very unsatisfied with the awkward placement required on classes preceding the Nevadas, which had five and six two-gun turrets—yet moving back to the four two-gun turrets of the  would be a significant loss in firepower. Although a triple turret was first proposed in American professional magazines in 1901 and briefly considered for the South Carolinas, it was not even in the experimental stage—the first turret was authorized in 1911 and would not be ready until months after contracts for the new ships would be signed with the shipbuilders. The decision to go ahead with the turret was a calculated gamble, but proved to be a qualified success; the only issue came with shell interference when the center and outside guns were fired simultaneously, which was easily solved by delaying the firing of the center barrel by a small fraction of a second. Moreover, there was a major benefit in weight thanks to the accompanying loss of an armored barbette and turret. These weight savings were applied to the armor protection, making the "all or nothing" concept a reality.

The Nevadas were also the first American battleships to use exclusively oil fuel, which had greater thermal efficiency than firing with coal or coal sprayed with oil. The cumulative effect of the change was measured by the navy as a fifty-five percent increase in steam production per pound of fuel (in a design for an oil-fired version of the ). This would give oil-fired vessels additional range, an important consideration for ships based in the Pacific, but the Navy's Bureau of Construction and Repair (C&R) pointed out what it saw as the unfortunate side effects, including a lower center of gravity, higher metacentric height, and the loss of coal bunkers, which were employed as part of the armor protection. Within a few years oil tanks below the waterline were considered indispensable parts of the underwater armor scheme employed in American dreadnoughts.

Design

The General Board's call for a new 1913 fiscal year battleship design was sent in June 1911 with the recent Nevada innovations in mind.

The design process was marked by various efforts to meet the General Board's specifications with only a moderate increase in tonnage over the Nevada class. Between January and March 1912, thirteen sketches were prepared for consideration by C&R with reciprocating or turbine engines that traded either speed or metacentric height for armor. The choice between double or triple turrets was also still an issue, as the Nevada class had not been completed yet. The Bureau of Ordnance was in favor of waiting for test results, rather than risking reverting to two-gun 14-inch turrets or moving up to two-gun 16-inch turrets.

In March 1912, C&R proposed their seventh, eighth, ninth, and tenth designs to the General Board for approval. The eighth and ninth designs were the ones to give up a half knot of speed, while the tenth was a design with four triple turrets and  lighter than the Nevada-class ships. In April, the General Board chose the seventh design, which satisfied all of their requirements, albeit on the largest displacement, . This design was further refined and emerged in a completed state in September. The delay was partially due to tests on the proposed armor, which were completed in June 1912 and resulted in significant alterations to the Pennsylvania-class' underwater protection.

Specifications

The Pennsylvania-class ships were significantly larger than their predecessors, the Nevada class. This was  longer than the older ships.

The ships had four direct drive Parsons steam turbine sets with geared cruising turbines, each of which drove a propeller  in diameter. They were powered by twelve Babcock & Wilcox water-tube boilers. Pennsylvania reached  during full-power trials in 1916, and Arizona reached  in September 1924. They had four  turbo generators.

The Pennsylvania class carried twelve 14-inch/45 caliber guns in triple gun turrets. The ships carried 100 shells for each gun. Defense against torpedo boats was provided by twenty-two 5-inch/51 caliber guns mounted in individual casemates in the sides of the hull; these proved vulnerable to sea spray and could not be worked in heavy seas. Each gun was provided with 230 rounds of ammunition. The ships mounted four /50 caliber anti-aircraft (AA) guns, although only two were fitted when completed. The other pair were added shortly afterward on top of Turret III. The class also mounted two submerged  torpedo tubes and carried 24 Bliss-Leavitt Mark 3 torpedoes for them.

The Pennsylvania-class design continued the all-or-nothing principle of armoring only the most important areas of the battleships, which began in the preceding Nevada class. The waterline armor belt of Krupp armor measured 13.5 inches thick and only covered the class' machinery spaces and magazines. The transverse bulkheads at each end of the ships ranged from 13 to 8 inches in thickness.

A 3-inch torpedo bulkhead was placed  inboard from the side, and the class was provided with a complete double bottom. Testing in mid-1914 revealed that this system could withstand  of TNT.

Authorization and construction

The authorization for the two Pennsylvania-class ships faced political opposition for being too weak and expensive. Tillman proposed a "maximum battleship" in a Senate resolution in July 1912, which was adopted unanimously:

Resolved: That the Committee on Naval Affairs [is] instructed to investigate and report to the Senate ... the object being to find out from official sources the maximum size and maximum draft, the maximum armament, and the maximum armor to make the best battleship or cruiser the world has ever seen or ever will see; to have this country own the greatest marine engine of war ever constructed or ever to be constructed under known conditions; and to report whether one such overpowering vessel would not in its judgement be better for this country to build than to continue by increasing taxation to spend the millions and millions of dollars now in prospect in the race for naval supremacy. ... Let us leave some money in the Treasury for other more necessary and useful expenditures, such as good roads, controlling the floods in the Mississippi, draining swamp land in the South, and irrigating the arid land in the West. (S 361, 62nd Cong., 2nd sess.)

Tillman's proposal was, in his own words, treated as a "joke"; the Advocate of Peace stated that "it is nearly impossible to read this ... without having an inextinguishable bout of laughter." Still, C&R published multiple studies of a battleship unconstrained by cost, although none of them approached Tillman's ideal.

Other politicians in Congress also had concerns with the navy's plans. The House of Representatives refused to fund any new battleships for the fiscal year 1913, though the Senate would fund two in its comparable bill. They eventually compromised on one, and the battleship that would become Pennsylvania was authorized on 22 August 1912. The ship's plans were given to prospective builders on 20 December; bids were opened on 18 February 1913; and the contract was awarded to the lowest bidder, Newport News, on 27 February 1913 at the quoted price of $7,260,000 without armor or armament. The independent bidding process led the navy to claim $750,000 in savings, but the final cost actually came in at $7,800,000 ($15,000,000 with armor and armament).

Arizona was the one approved battleship for the fiscal year 1914. Secretary of the Navy George von Lengerke Meyer had requested three battleships for that fiscal year, citing the former policy of building two per year, plus an additional ship to make up for authorizing only Pennsylvania in the previous year, but congressional compromises once again approved only one new battleship. Arizona was authorized on 4 March 1913, but to avoid a lengthy delay between the two, the ship was ordered much more quickly, on 24 June, by giving the contract to a navy-owned shipyard.

Pennsylvania was laid down on 27 October 1913, with goals of fourteen months until launch, and thirty-two until completion. The as-yet unnamed Arizona was laid down on the morning of 16 March 1914 with Assistant Secretary of the Navy Franklin Delano Roosevelt in attendance, and the builders intended to set a world-record ten months between keel-laying and launch, These ambitious goals—Pennsylvanias anticipated completion date was a full two months earlier than the American record—were set by Navy Secretary Josephus Daniels, who wanted the United States to compete with British and German achievements.

The constructors were not able to meet these goals. Pennsylvania was launched on 16 March 1915, a full seventeen months after keel-laying, when it was just over two-thirds complete. Movie cameras were used to film the launch to provide data for future launches. After their launches, both ships went through the necessary fitting-out period and sea trials. These attributes pleased the Navy's Board of Inspection, but Scientific American lamented the ship's low speed compared to the Italian s, Russian s, and British s, which they (somewhat inaccurately) stated had top speeds of 22.5, 23, and 25 knots, respectively. Pennsylvania was commissioned on 12 June 1916, its sister ship followed on 17 October 1916.

Ships

Service histories

Pennsylvania and Arizona were commissioned during the First World War, but prior to the United States' entry on the side of the Allies. During their first year, the ships were cleaned and readied for full active duty. Pennsylvania became the flagship of the Atlantic Fleet on 12 October 1916. Arizona first fired its main guns on 23 December, but issues with a stripped turbine kept the ship almost exclusively in the New York Navy Yard from December 1916 to March 1917. Both ships were based in the United States for the duration of the war, owing to a shortage of fuel oil in the United Kingdom, and only the coal-burning battleships of Battleship Division Nine were sent across the Atlantic. It was only after the armistice in 1918 that both Pennsylvania-class battleships were sent to Europe. Arizona departed first, leaving on 18 November and arriving in Portsmouth in the United Kingdom on the 30th. Pennsylvania escorted the American President Woodrow Wilson's transport, across the Atlantic for the Paris Peace Conference in 1919. In 1921 and 1922, during the inter-war period, both ships took part in a mission to Peru and were transferred to the Pacific Fleet.

Pennsylvania and Arizona were given extensive modernizations from 1929 through 1931; the expenditure came in the fiscal year 1930. As part of the rebuilding, Pennsylvania, which had been designed as a fleet flagship, had its conning tower expanded. Aside from that, Pennsylvania and Arizona received similar treatment: the elevation of the main batteries was increased to °, new fire control systems on tripod masts were added, the secondary armament and directors were replaced and overhauled, eight 5-inch/25 caliber anti-aircraft guns (four per side) were mounted on the weather deck which was above the secondary anti-ship 5-inch gun battery, and their bridges were enlarged to hold elevated anti-aircraft directors. Armor additions were comparatively minimal beyond anti-torpedo bulges, which were standard additions on all major warships in this period:  of armor were added to the second armored deck, and a torpedo bulkhead was added to the engine room. The propulsion system of the two Pennsylvanias received perhaps the most attention. The boiler system was entirely replaced with six small-tube boilers and new turbines, the latter partially from the cancelled  battleship .

After their modernization, both ships participated in the normal activities of the fleet, including fleet problem exercises, and then joined the entire Pacific Fleet in their new base in Pearl Harbor, Hawaii, after the beginning of the Second World War in Europe. Two years later, on 7 December 1941, the Japanese attack on Pearl Harbor sank Arizona in a tremendous explosion and slightly damaged Pennsylvania, which was in dry dock at the time. Arizonas wreck was later partly salvaged and is now a war memorial.

Pennsylvania came back into service more quickly than many of the other battleships present during the attack; it left on 20 December and was under repair in San Francisco until 30 March 1942. For the next several months, Pennsylvania was stationed on the United States' West Coast, before being reassigned to Pearl Harbor as the fleet flagship for a short time (August to October). After another refit in San Francisco, which lasted until February 1943, the ship was sent to assist American forces engaged in the Aleutian Islands Campaign.

For the next year, Pennsylvania provided shore bombardment during the Battles of Makin, Kwajalein, Eniwetok, and Saipan, along with the Palau Islands Campaign. The ship also participated in the landings on Leyte and the Battle of Leyte Gulf. During this time, Pennsylvania was present at the last battle ever between battleships, the Battle of Surigao Strait. The ship did not fire any salvos because the Japanese vessels were turned away or sunk at long range, beyond Pennsylvanias outdated fire control but within range of other, radar-directed battleships.

After its completion in July, the ship bombarded Wake Island on 1 August en route to Okinawa, where it was struck by an air-dropped torpedo. It hit near the starboard propeller shaft, killing twenty men and knocking out three of the ship's four shafts. This area was vital, and the opened seals around the shafts led to large amounts of flooding that nearly sank the battleship. Pennsylvania was towed to shallower waters, where local repairs were made. The ship's last action was to fire at a kamikaze on 13 August; it was then towed to Guam beginning on the 18th, where temporary repairs were effected, before being sent to Navy Yard Puget Sound for a more permanent solution. Pennsylvania made it to Puget Sound on 24 October, albeit not without a great deal of trouble caused by temporary repair work.

With the Japanese surrender on 2 September, the Puget Sound repairs were limited to those necessary to ensure Pennsylvanias delivery to Bikini Atoll for atomic experiments in July 1946. The old battleship survived the tests, but was decommissioned on 29 August and used for radiological studies prior to being sunk as a target ship on 10 February 1948. Pennsylvania was struck from the Navy Vessel Register nine days later.

Footnotes

Endnotes

References
 "Arizona." Dictionary of American Naval Fighting Ships. Naval History & Heritage Command.
 "Battleship Pennsylvania." Journal of the American Society of Naval Engineers 27, no. 2 (1915): 519.
 Barber, G.H. "Launching of the Battleship Arizona," International Marine Engineering 20, no. 8 (1915): 334–36.
 Breyer, Siegfried. Battleships and Battle Cruisers, 1905–1970. Translated by Alfred Kurti. Garden City, NY: Doubleday, 1973. .
 Campbell, John. Naval Weapons of World War II. Annapolis, MD: Naval Institute Press, 1985. . OCLC .
 Cates Junior, Clifton B. War History of the USS Pennsylvania BB (38). N.p.: Ship's Welfare Fund, 1946. OCLC .
 Friedman, Norman. Battleship Design and Development, 1905–1945. New York: Mayflower Books, 1978. . OCLC .
 Friedman Norman. US Battleships: An Illustrated Design History. Annapolis, MD: Naval Institute Press, 1985. . OCLC .
 Gill, C.C. "'Pennsylvania' Trials." Proceedings 42, no. 2 (1916): 584.
 Jones, Jerry W. US Battleship Operations in World War I. Annapolis, Maryland: Naval Institute Press, 1998. . .
 McCarthy, J. Crosby. "Launching a Giant Battleship a Long-planned and Risky Job." Popular Mechanics 14, no. 5 (1915): 673–76.
 "Pennsylvania." Dictionary of American Naval Fighting Ships. Naval History & Heritage Command.
 "Recent Launches." International Marine Engineering 20, no. 4 (1915): 180.
 Stillwell, Paul. Battleship Arizona: An Illustrated History. Annapolis, Maryland: Naval Institute Press, 1991. . OCLC .
 Tillman, Benjamin Ryan and William Adger Moffett. Construction of Battleships: Remarks of Hon. Benjamin R. Tillman ... United States Navy. 64th Cong., 1st sess., 20 June 1916. S. Doc 465.
 "Trials of the Battleship Pennsylvania." International Marine Engineering 21, no. 4 (1916): 189.
 "The Tillman Maximum Battleship." Advocate of Peace 74, no. 7 (1912): 182–83.
 "The United States Battleship 'Pennsylvania' and Class." Scientific American 111, no. 13 (1911): 244, 254.
 "Trials of Our Latest Dreadnought." Scientific American 114, no. 12 (1916): 297.
 Whitley, M.J. Battleships of World War Two: An International Encyclopedia. Annapolis, MD: Naval Institute Press, 1998. . OCLC .
 Wright, Christopher C., ed. (2002–03). "The US Navy's Study of the Loss of the Battleship Arizona". Warship International 39–40 (3, 4, 1): 247–99, 360–80, 44–105.

External links

 USS Pennsylvania (BB-38, originally Battleship # 38), 1916–1948 (US Navy)
 USS Arizona (BB 39)  (US Navy)
 
 

 
 
Battleship classes
World War I battleships of the United States